The Fayetteville Veterans Administration Hospital is a medical facility of the United States Department of Veterans Affairs at 1100 North College Avenue in Fayetteville, Arkansas.  Set in a campus-like environment are a hospital and other care facilities, residences, and other utility buildings.  The core of the complex, including its main hospital building, were built in 1934, and represent an architecturally cohesive collection of Colonial and Classical Revival buildings.

A  area of the facility was listed on the National Register of Historic Places in 2012.

See also
National Register of Historic Places listings in Washington County, Arkansas
List of Veterans Affairs medical facilities

References

External links
Official VA website

Hospital buildings completed in 1934
Hospitals in Arkansas
Historic districts on the National Register of Historic Places in Arkansas
National Register of Historic Places in Fayetteville, Arkansas
1934 establishments in Arkansas
Government buildings completed in 1934
Neoclassical architecture in Arkansas
Colonial Revival architecture in Arkansas
Veterans Affairs medical facilities